Mercer McCall "Mack" Tharpe (July 12, 1903 – February 21, 1945) was a college football player and coach, bomber pilot, and insurance salesman. He was killed in action during the Second World War.

Georgia Tech
Tharpe was a prominent tackle for William Alexander's Georgia Tech Yellow Jackets football team, selected All-Southern in 1926.

He returned to his alma mater to coach in 1928, promoted to line coach in 1934. In 1931, he sought a scouting report on North Carolina, and Robert Neyland had Bobby Dodd explain the defense to him.

Along with Alexander he is the namesake of the Alexander-Tharpe fund. Tharpe was inducted into the Georgia Tech Athletics Hall of Fame in 1961.

References

External links

 

1903 births
1945 deaths
American football tackles
Georgia Tech Yellow Jackets football coaches
Georgia Tech Yellow Jackets football players
People from Moultrie, Georgia
All-Southern college football players
United States Army Air Forces personnel killed in World War II
Players of American football from Georgia (U.S. state)